Venkatanarasimharajuvaripeta railway station or Venkata Narasimha Rajuvaripet railway station or V N Rajuvaripeta railway station (station code: VKZ) is a railway station in Andhra Pradesh on the border with Tamil Nadu, India. It is on the Renigunta–Arakkonam section of Southern Railway, with the distinction of having the second longest name among all stations on the Indian Railways, following the renaming of Chennai Central to Puratchi Thalaivar Dr. M.G. Ramachandran Central railway station in Chennai, Tamil Nadu.

Trains
In railway parlance, it is a flag station. It is unsignalled and passenger trains halt here, but mail trains and express trains do not halt here.

See also
Ib – the railway station in Odisha on Indian Railways with the shortest name.

References

External links
 IRFCA Trivia
Picture of the station on IRFCA

Railway stations in Chittoor district
Chennai railway division